Brent Douglas Webb (born 9 November 1979) is a former New Zealand international rugby league footballer who played as a . He previously played for the New Zealand Warriors in the NRL, before moving the Leeds Rhinos and the Catalans Dragons in the Super League.

Background
Webb was born in Cairns, Queensland, Australia. He is of Torres Strait Islander descent.

He was educated at Townsville's Kirwan State High School. He played his junior rugby for the Cairns Kangaroos. He was the Queensland Cup leading try scorer in 2001 before being spotted by Daniel Anderson, and signed by the New Zealand Warriors.

Professional playing career

New Zealand Warriors
Webb made his NRL début for the Warriors in front of a home crowd against the Newcastle Knights on 1 April 2002, aged 21. He was named the Supporters' Player of the Year in 2003 and 2004. Webb became eligible for national team selection after living in New Zealand for three years. He was part of the New Zealand squad that won the 2005 Rugby League Tri-Nations. 2006 was Webb's last year for the Warriors. Despite being the club's top try-scorer with a career best 11 tries, it was a frustrating season.

Leeds Rhinos

In 2007 Webb joined Leeds Rhinos in the Super League on a two-year contract. He came to Leeds Rhinos fresh from being one of the players of the tournament in the Tri Nations. He became a favorite of the Leeds fans, and his attacking play earned him the chant from the South Stand spectators, 'Brent Webb is Superman!'.

Webb received a four match ban following two head high tackles in the Leeds Rhinos 2007 match against the Harlequins RL at the Twickenham Stoop. The Kiwi international had an eventful game, being placed on report twice and sin-binned, but then scoring two tries and having a hand in others.

Webb was forced to withdraw from the New Zealand squad for the 2008 Rugby League World Cup through injury.

He played in the 2009 Super League Grand Final victory over St. Helens at Old Trafford.

He played in the 2010 Challenge Cup Final defeat by the Warrington Wolves at Wembley Stadium.

On 29 June 2011 Brent signed a new 1-year deal with the Leeds Rhinos to keep him at the club until the end of 2012, despite reports linking him with a move to newly promoted Widnes Vikings.

Later that year he played at fullback in the 2011 Challenge Cup Final defeat by the Wigan Warriors at Wembley Stadium.

He played in the 2011 Super League Grand Final victory over St. Helens at Old Trafford.

Catalans Dragons
It was announced on 4 September 2012 that Webb had signed for the Catalans Dragons on a two-year deal. However, after a promising start, he suffered a recurrence of his back injury and subsequently lost his place in the team to Morgan Escare. After failing to recover, Webb was forced to retire from professional rugby league in 2014.

Personal life
His partner Jenny gave birth to their first son in April 2007 and named him Ruben Douglas Webb, after retired Kiwis' captain Ruben Wiki.

References

External links
Leeds Rhinos profile
(archived by web.archive.org) Leeds profile
 tvnz.co.nz Warriors profile
(archived by web.archive.org) NZ Warriors profile
(archived by web.archive.org) Brent Webb feature
(archived by web.archive.org) Brent Webb at RLeague.com

1979 births
Living people
Australian emigrants to New Zealand
Australian people of New Zealand descent
Australian expatriate sportspeople in France
Australian expatriate sportspeople in England
Australian rugby league players
Catalans Dragons players
Expatriate rugby league players in England
Expatriate rugby league players in France
Indigenous Australian rugby league players
Leeds Rhinos players
New Zealand expatriate rugby league players
New Zealand expatriate sportspeople in France
New Zealand expatriate sportspeople in England
New Zealand national rugby league team players
New Zealand Warriors players
North Harbour rugby league team players
Northcote Tigers players
People educated at Kirwan State High School
Rugby league players from Cairns
Rugby league fullbacks
Torres Strait Islanders